Benjamin Bonzi and Antoine Hoang were the defending champions but only Hoang chose to defend his title, partnering Romain Arneodo. Hoang lost in the quarterfinals to Jonathan Eysseric and Quentin Halys.

Viktor Durasovic and Patrik Niklas-Salminen won the title after defeating Eysseric and Halys 7–5, 7–6(7–1) in the final.

Seeds

Draw

References

External links
 Main draw

Play In Challenger - Doubles